Rojelio "Ray" Arredondo (born September 21, 1950) is an American former sport shooter who competed in the 1988 Summer Olympics. He was born in Hidalgo County, Texas.

References

1950 births
Living people
American male sport shooters
ISSF pistol shooters
Olympic shooters of the United States
Shooters at the 1988 Summer Olympics
People from Hidalgo County, Texas
United States Army soldiers
Pan American Games medalists in shooting
Pan American Games gold medalists for the United States
Pan American Games silver medalists for the United States
Shooters at the 1987 Pan American Games
Medalists at the 1987 Pan American Games
21st-century American people
20th-century American people